The SP-64 is a highway in the southeastern part of the state of São Paulo in Brazil.  The highway name is the Rodovia do Resgate and runs from Bananal up to the state of Rio de Janeiro.

References

Highways in São Paulo (state)